Dandaneh (also Romanized as Dandāneh; also known as Gargāh, Jūb Dandāneh, and Kargāh) is a village in Howmeh Rural District, in the Central District of Gilan-e Gharb County, Kermanshah Province, Iran. At the 2006 census, its population was 263, in 51 families.

References 

Populated places in Gilan-e Gharb County